Lists of monarchs in the British Isles are lists of monarchs that have reigned over the various kingdoms and other states that have existed in the British Isles throughout recorded history. They include monarchs of Britain as a whole, and monarchs of states that covered part or whole of what are now England, Ireland, Scotland, Wales and the Isle of Man.

Britain
King of the Britons
Ancient Britons (legendary)
Great Britain and the United Kingdom

England
England
Bretwaldas / Heptarchy

Angles
Bernicia
Deira
East Anglia
Essex
Hwicce
Isle of Wight
Kent 
Lindsey
Magonsæte
Mercia
Northumbria
Sussex
Wessex
York

Ireland
Monarchy
Lists of Irish kings / kingdoms
High Kings

Ailech
Airgíalla
Breifne
Connacht
Dublin
Leinster
Mide
Moylurg
Munster
Osraige
Tara
Tir Eogain
Uisnech
Ulster

Scotland
Scotland
Legendary kings of Scotland

Aeron
Dál Riata
Eidyn
Galloway
Gododdin
Isles / Isles (lords) / Islay
Orkney
Picts
Rhinns
Strathclyde

Wales
Wales
Pendragon

Elmet
Gwynedd
Powys
Rheged

Cornwall
Dumnonia
Ancient Cornwall (legendary)
Dukes

Mann
Mann
Mann & the Isles
Mann (lords)

See also
Carausian Revolt

British Isles
British Isles-related lists

bg:Крал на Обединено кралство Великобритания и Северна Ирландия
cs:Seznam anglických a britských panovníků
cy:Brenhinoedd y Deyrnas Unedig
de:Liste der britischen Monarchen
eo:Listo de britaj reĝoj
fr:Monarques de Grande-Bretagne
ko:영국의 군주
it:Elenco di monarchi britannici
he:מלכי בריטניה
kw:Myghternedh an Rywvaneth Unys
la:Index Regum Britanniae
lb:Lëscht vun de britesche Monarchen
li:Keuninge van Ingeland, Sjotland, Groet-Brittannië en 't Vereineg Keuninkriek
hu:A Brit-szigetek uralkodóinak listája
mk:Листа на британски монарси
nl:Lijst van Britse koningen
ja:イギリス君主一覧
no:Liste over britiske monarker
pt:Lista de monarcas britânicos
ru:Список королей Англии
sl:Seznam britanskih kraljev
fi:Luettelo Englannin kuninkaista
sv:Lista över Storbritanniens regenter
zh:英国君主列表